Ukel Oyaghiri (born 1964) is a lawyer and politician who has served as the Rivers State Commissioner of Women Affairs since 2015. She replaced Joeba West who had served in the Executive Council under former governor Chibuike Amaechi.

Education
Oyaghiri attended Rivers State School of Basic Studies in Port Harcourt where she obtained her West African Senior School Certificate. She earned a B.A.ED. Hons. degree from the University of Port Harcourt in 1989. Her LL.B. and B.L. qualifications were obtained from the Rivers State University of Science and Technology and the Nigerian Law School respectively.

Career
She worked as public relations assistant in Rivbank Insurance Company from 1989 to 1990, public administrative officer in Pamo Clinics & Hospitals Limited from 1990 to 1997, personal assistant to Bayelsa State Commissioner of Education from 1997 to 1998 and legal officer in Adedipe & Adedipe Legal Practitioners from 2004 to 2007. She was the managing solicitor of A.S. Oyaghiri & Associates Legal Practitioners from 2011, until her appointment in December 2015 as Commissioner of Women Affairs.

Other positions held
 Chairman, Rivers State Taekwondo Association (1996–1998)
 Vice Chairman, Taekwondo Association of Nigeria (1993–1996)
 President of Orashi Women Association and Secretary Elder`s Forum, Voice of Orashi.

Memberships
 Member, Nigerian Bar Association
 Member, International Federation of Women Lawyers
 Member, International Bar Association

References

1964 births
Living people
People from Abua–Odual
Rivers State lawyers
First Wike Executive Council
University of Port Harcourt alumni
Commissioners of ministries of Rivers State
Rivers State University alumni
Rivers State Peoples Democratic Party politicians
Women's ministers
Nigerian Christians
21st-century Nigerian politicians
21st-century Nigerian women politicians
Women government ministers of Nigeria